Ashes and Roses is the twelfth studio album released by American music artist Mary Chapin Carpenter. The album was released on June 12, 2012 on Zoë Records and was produced by Carpenter and Matt Rollings. It is Carpenter's fourth album released under the Zoë record label.  It contains thirteen original songs written by Carpenter with an available fourteenth deluxe edition track.

Track listing 
All songs composed by Mary Chapin Carpenter.

 "Transcendental Reunion" – 4:47
 "What to Keep and What to Throw Away" – 4:33
 "The Swords We Carried" – 4:05
 "Another Home" – 4:29
 "Chasing What's Already Gone" – 4:57
 "Learning the World" – 4:30
 "I Tried Going West" – 4:16
 "Don't Need Much to Be Happy" – 4:22
 "Soul Companion" (featuring James Taylor) – 4:00
 "Old Love" – 4:44
 "New Year's Day" – 4:56
 "Fading Away" – 4:19
 "Jericho" – 4:01
Barnes & Noble exclusive bonus track
 "The One Who's Not Enough" – 3:28

References 

Mary Chapin Carpenter albums
2012 albums
Albums produced by Matt Rollings
Zoë Records albums